Roman Mikhaylovich Dmitriyev (7 March 1949 – 11 February 2010) was a Russian freestyle wrestler, coach and politician of Yakut heritage. He competed at the 1972 and 1976 Olympics and won a gold and a silver medal, respectively. Between 1969 and 1974 he won four medals at world championships, including a gold in 1973; he was also a European champion in 1969. Domestically Dmitriyev won the Soviet championships in 1969, 1971, 1972, 1976, 1979 and 1981.

In 1981 Dmitriyev retired from competitions to become a coach of Soviet senior and then junior wrestling teams. He also took various positions at the Russian Wrestling Federation. In 2008 he was elected to the Duma of Sakha Republic. He died in Moscow in 2010.

References

External links
 

1949 births
2010 deaths
Soviet male sport wrestlers
Russian wrestling coaches
Russian politicians
Olympic wrestlers of the Soviet Union
Wrestlers at the 1972 Summer Olympics
Wrestlers at the 1976 Summer Olympics
Russian male sport wrestlers
Olympic gold medalists for the Soviet Union
Olympic silver medalists for the Soviet Union
Olympic medalists in wrestling
Medalists at the 1976 Summer Olympics
Medalists at the 1972 Summer Olympics
European Wrestling Championships medalists
World Wrestling Championships medalists
Yakut people
Sportspeople from Sakha
People from Yakutsk